The Women's Points Race was one of the 8 women's events at the 2008 UCI Track Cycling World Championships, held in Manchester, United Kingdom.

22 Cyclists from 22 countries participated in the contest. Because of the number of entries, there were no qualification rounds for this discipline. Consequently, the event was run direct to the final.

Final
The Final and only race was run on March 29. The competition consisted on 100 laps, making a total of 25 km with 10 sprints.

Elapsed Time=31:58.990
Average Speed=46.899 km/h

References

Women's points race
UCI Track Cycling World Championships – Women's points race